Mycolicibacter paraterrae (formerly Mycobacterium paraterrae) is a species of bacteria from the phylum Actinomycetota that was first isolated from the sputum of a patient with an unspecified pulmonary infection. It forms orange colonies when grown in the dark and grows slowly at 25–37 °C. It has also been isolated from

References

Acid-fast bacilli
paraterrae
Bacteria described in 2010